Vasyl Prodan (born 15 March 1988) is a professional Ukrainian football midfielder who currently plays for FC Obolon-Brovar Kyiv in the Ukrainian First League.

Prodan is a product off the Odessa city football academies including Chornomorets and Spartak. He became noticeable during the 2015-16 Ukrainian First League season when he scored seven goals playing for Obolon-Brovar.

References

External links
 
 
 

1988 births
Living people
Ukrainian footballers
FC Dnister Ovidiopol players
FC Real Pharma Odesa players
FC Obolon-Brovar Kyiv players
Association football midfielders
Ukrainian First League players